Edling is an obsolete Welsh title. Edling may also refer to:

Edling, Germany, a village
Edling, a commune in the Moselle department in northeastern France
Edling (surname)